Olivier Hay, also known as Luffy or Louffy, is a French professional fighting games player of Teochew descent who specializes in Street Fighter and King of Fighters.

Hay began his Street Fighter career in 2009. He is famous for being the first Street Fighter IV player to bring the character Rose to competitive levels and also for being the first European player to win a tournament for a Street Fighter game at Evolution Championship Series (EVO), being the 2014 champion for Ultra Street Fighter IV. Hay's reason for maining Rose is because he thinks that she looks attractive.

While he prefers his nickname to be spelt Luffy, some French Internet medias spell his nickname as Louffy to avoid confusion with the One Piece character, whom he took his nickname from. Hay is well known for using a PS1 controller as his controller of choice. Hay has a pet dog named RADIO in which he will dedicate his tournament victories to.

Hay became so dominant in the European Street Fighter scene to the point that he had a tournament dedicated to him called "The Luffy Beatdown Special" in which Hay placed 7th. He left Team Meltdown on January 2, 2016.

On January 1, 2016, Hay left Meltdown after his strong resume with the team. Hay's reason for the departure was that he was offered sponsorships in advance. Hay has confirmed Team YP as his future sponsorship. His personal sponsor is RedBull and he plays for Team ARES.

Notable Street Fighter tournament results 
Hay has ranked well in a number of Street Fighter IV and Street Fighter V tournaments.

2010 
Luffy's Rose got noticed for the first time by sending Daigo Umehara to the loser's bracket in the 2010 edition of the World Game Cup tournament series in Cannes.

2013 
 World Game Cup 2013 : 5th
 Red Fight District 2 : 2nd
 Paris Full Contact I : 1st
 DreamHack Valencia 2013 : 2nd
 Shadowloo Showdown 2013 : 4th
 DreamHack Winter 2013 : 3rd

2014 
 International Video Game Cup 2014 : 4th
 Stunfest 2014 : 1st
 Republic of Fighters 3 : 3rd
 Evolution Championship Series 2014 : 1st
 DreamHack Valencia 2014 : 1st
 VSFighting 4 : 2nd
 DreamHack Stockholm 2014 : 1st
 Red Fight District 3 : 1st
 DreamHack Winter 2014 : 4th
 Capcom Cup 2014 : 3rd

2015 
 Sonic Boom 2015 : 5th
 Red Bull Kumite 2015 : 9th
 Hypespotting 4 : 3rd
 FFM Rumble 2015 : 1st
 DreamHack Summer 2015 : 1st
 VSFighting 5 : 1st
 DreamHack London 2015 : 5th
 EGX 2015 : 1st
 Red Fight District 4 : 1st
 Milan Games Week 2015 : 5th
 Street Grand Battle 2015 : 5th
 DreamHack Winter 2015 : 2nd
 Capcom Cup 2015 : 9th

2016 
 Stunfest 2016 - 13th
 Dreamhack Summer 2016 - 5th

2017 
 France Cup - 1st (representing Team Courbevoie with CCL, Evans, Genius and Valmaster)

2018 
 Evolution Championship Series 2018 : 5th

Notable King of Fighters XIII tournament results 
Hay has ranked well in a number of King of Fighters XIII tournaments.

2013 
 World Game Cup 2013 : 4th
 Red Fight District 2 : 4th
 Shadowloo Showdown 2013 : 3rd

2014 
 Stunfest 2014 : 3rd
 Republic of Fighters 3 : 3rd

2015 
 Hypespotting 4 : 2nd

References 

Living people
Sportspeople from Paris
French esports players
Fighting game players
French people of Chinese descent
Street Fighter players
Year of birth missing (living people)